Leura railway station is located on the Main Western line in New South Wales, Australia. It serves the Blue Mountains town of Leura opening on 6 December 1890.

Platforms & services
Leura has one island platform with two sides. It is serviced by NSW TrainLink Blue Mountains Line services travelling from Sydney Central to Lithgow.

Transport links
Blue Mountains Transit operate three routes via Leura station:
685H: Springwood to Hazelbrook
690K: Springwood to Katoomba
695: South Leura to Katoomba

References

External links

Leura station details Transport for New South Wales

Easy Access railway stations in New South Wales
Railway stations in Australia opened in 1890
Regional railway stations in New South Wales
Short-platform railway stations in New South Wales, 6 cars
Main Western railway line, New South Wales